The Goliath Atlas  also sold as Hansa-Lloyd Atlas is an cab over truck that was produced from 1932 to 1935 in Bremen, Germany. It was not the first, but an early one ton freight trucks of the German Goliath Company and it got a closed driver cab.

As later microcars like the Isetta or the Zündapp Janus, it had a front door only, to enter the cab. A fixed steering column and a door hinge on the left, required the passenger to exit first.

Original cost were: 2450 Reichsmark.

Competitors 
 Magirus M10

References

External links 
 A 1934 Goliath Atlas at the Lanemuseum Nashville, TN

Atlas
Rear-wheel-drive vehicles
Vehicles introduced in 1932